Anthony Kristian Baller (born 18 February 1987) is a rugby league footballer who plays for the West Wales Raiders in Betfred League 1.

Background
Baller was born in Abercynon, Wales.

Playind career
Kristian Baller played his youth rugby for Merthyr RFC before returning to his hometown club at senior level.

Gaining international honours with Wales at under 18 level, and touring with the Wales Crawshays under 20s, Kristian gained a reputation as an attacking full back or wing and a competent goal kicker.

Invited to join Pontypridd as a trialist during the summer of 2006, Kristian was duly drafted into the club's senior squad for the commencement of the ensuing season. Making some impressive try scoring appearances in Ponty's league and campaigns, Kristian was called up to the Blues regional under 20 squad.

Playing across numerous positions during the 2008–2009 season, Kristian proved his versatility – able to cover almost any three-quarter position with an assured ease.

At the commencement of the 2009–2010 season, in a squad blessed with wingers and full backs, Kristian decided that he would opt for Scrum Half as his preferred position, hoping that the move would lead to further honours.

References

External links
West Wales Raiders profile
Pontypridd RFC profile
Llandovery RFC profile
Cross Keys RFC profile

1987 births
Living people
Pontypridd RFC players
Rugby league players from Rhondda Cynon Taf
Rugby union players from Abercynon
South Wales Scorpions players
Welsh rugby league players
Welsh rugby union players